Richard Hendrie (22 November 1895 – 15 April 1964) was a Scottish professional football left back, best remembered for his spells as player and manager in the Football League with Gillingham.

Playing career
Hendrie played for Petershill, Queen's Park and Airdrieonians in his native Scotland. Either side of a two-year spell with Third Division South club Gillingham, Hendrie played English non-league football for Maidstone United, Margate and Grays Thurrock United. He finished his career with Third Division South club Brentford and retired in 1929.

Managerial and coaching career
While a player at Brentford between 1927 and 1929, Hendrie served as assistant to manager Harry Curtis. He returned to Gillingham in 1929 and managed the club until 1931, when he returned to the Southern League to manage Tunbridge Wells Rangers.

Personal life 
Hendrie served as a signalman in the Royal Naval Volunteer Reserve during the First World War.

Career statistics

References

External links 

 

1895 births
1964 deaths
Footballers from Airdrie, North Lanarkshire
Scottish footballers
Scottish football managers
Association football fullbacks
Airdrieonians F.C. (1878) players
Queen's Park F.C. players
Maidstone United F.C. (1897) players
Gillingham F.C. players
Brentford F.C. players
Gillingham F.C. managers
Brentford F.C. non-playing staff
Petershill F.C. players
Margate F.C. players
Grays Thurrock United F.C. players
Southern Football League managers
English Football League players
English Football League managers
Scottish Football League players
Southern Football League players
Royal Naval Volunteer Reserve personnel of World War I